A statue of Robert Milligan was installed at the West India Docks in London, in 1813. Milligan was a merchant, and was largely responsible for the construction of the West India Docks. After being put in storage in 1943, it was re-erected by  the London Docklands Development Corporation in 1997.

On 9 June 2020, the statue was removed, coinciding with a drive to review slaver statues launched by the Mayor of London, Sadiq Khan.

History
Robert Milligan (1746–1809) was a prominent Scottish merchant, ship-owner and slave-factor, who was the driving force behind the construction of the West India Docks in London. The statue was commissioned by the West India Dock Company from the sculptor Richard Westmacott in May 1809, following Milligan's death.  
From its installation in 1813 the statue stood by the Hibbert Gate, until 1875 when it was moved to the North Gate. It was put into storage in 1943, where it remained until 1997, when it was re-erected at its original location on the West India Dock by the London Docklands Development Corporation. The Museum of London Docklands opened in buildings directly behind the statue in 2003.

"Father of the Island" in 1998

In 1998 an article in The Islander, a community newspaper sponsored by the Association of Island Communities on the local Isle of Dogs, published a photograph of the statue with another featuring Max Hebditch, at the time director of the Museum of London Docklands, with Roger Squire, at that time the Joint Chief Executive of the London Docklands Development Corporation, who had made the arrangements to return the statue to its original place. The article argued that Milligan was a genius who had persuaded the city merchants to build the West India Docks on the Isle of Dogs, rather than in Wapping. Dubbing Milligan "the father of the Isle of Dogs", the article called for Wednesday 12 July 2000 to be celebrated as the bicentenary of the laying of the docks' foundation stone in 1800.

Shrouding in 2007
In 2007, when the Museum of London Docklands opened the London, Sugar and Slavery gallery, the connection between the West India Dock, the sugar warehouses which now house the museum and the exploitation of enslaved Africans on West Indian sugar plantations was made explicit. The 1811 portrait of George Hibbert by Thomas Lawrence had been moved from a place where he had been revered as playing a heroic role in the creation of the dock to a position in the new gallery with a caption clarifying his role as a politician and slave owner who resisted the abolition of slavery. In November, at the time of the opening of the exhibition, the statue of Robert Milligan was shrouded in black cloth, tied up with rope – although this was removed after the event. The museum also elicited the thoughts of members of the public as regards the statue in relation to Milligan's involvement with the enslavement of Africans.

Removal in 2020

Following the vandalism and removal of Edward Colston's statue in Bristol by anti-racism protesters in response to the murder of George Floyd, a petition was launched to remove the statue of Milligan. Set up by Labour councillor Ehtasham Haque, it attracted 4,000 signatures in less than two days. He described the fact that the statue still existed in 2020 as "an insult to humanity". A series of evening protests was planned.

The statue was covered with a shroud by protesters, and placards were attached to it. On 9 June 2020, the Museum of London Docklands issued a statement saying how this made the statue an "object of protest", and said that they believed it should remain so for as long as the statue remained. They added that they "advocate for the statue of Robert Milligan to be removed on the grounds of its historical links to colonial violence and exploitation." Later that day, the statue was removed by the local authority, and the landowners the Canal & River Trust, to "recognise the wishes of the community". The statue was removed on the same day that Sadiq Khan announced plans to establish a Commission for Diversity in the Public Realm.

Museum ownership
In March 2022 the Canal & River Trust, which owned the statute, donated it to the Museum of London. The intention is to display the statute at the Museum of London Docklands in due course.

See also

 List of monuments and memorials removed during the George Floyd protests
 List of public art formerly in London
 List of public statues of individuals linked to the Atlantic slave trade
 Actions against memorials in the United Kingdom during the George Floyd protests

References

Further reading
 
 

2020 disestablishments in England
Buildings and structures in the London Borough of Tower Hamlets
Milligan, Robert
Monuments and memorials in London
Monuments and memorials removed during the George Floyd protests
Sculptures by Richard Westmacott
Sculptures of men in the United Kingdom
Statues in London
Vandalized works of art in the United Kingdom